Rufat Quliyev (born 4 December 1972, in Azerbaijan) is a retired Azerbaijani football player. He played for Khazri Buzovna, FK Qarabağ, Shafa Baku, Esteghlal Tehran FC and Sanat Naft Abadan FC. He is usually played in the midfielder position.

References

External links
 
 

1972 births
Living people
Azerbaijani footballers
Azerbaijani expatriate footballers
Qarabağ FK players
Esteghlal F.C. players
Sanat Naft Abadan F.C. players
Expatriate footballers in Iran
Association football midfielders
Azerbaijan international footballers